Hickory Hill, also known as the Price-Everett House, is a historic home located near Hamilton, Martin County, North Carolina. The original Greek Revival style section was built about 1847, and is a two-story double-pile, frame building with a center-hall plan. It is three bays by two bays, and has a low hipped roof and two interior chimneys with stuccoed stacks. The present one-story, hipped roof, full-facade Victorian porch was added in the 1880s.  The house was considerably refurbished in the Colonial Revival style during the early-20th century.

It was added to the National Register of Historic Places in 1984.

References

Houses on the National Register of Historic Places in North Carolina
Greek Revival houses in North Carolina
Victorian architecture in North Carolina
Colonial Revival architecture in North Carolina
Houses completed in 1847
Houses in Martin County, North Carolina
National Register of Historic Places in Martin County, North Carolina
1847 establishments in North Carolina